Mariano Romano (born 7 July 1989) is an Italian footballer who plays for Aversa Normanna.

Biography
Born in Naples, Campania, Romano started his career at Tuscany side Siena. On 3 July 2009, he was loaned to Serie B side Sassuolo with option to co-own the player in June 2010.

On 21 January 2010, he was loaned to Pergocrema of Lega Pro Prima Divisione. which he already trained with the team since 2 January.

On 9 July 2010, Romano remained at Prima Divisione, but for newly promoted side South Tyrol. Siena teammate Thomas Albanese also joined him on loan.

On 15 July 2011 Romano, Mihail Ivanov, Reyza Soudant and Saverio Cutrupi were signed by Atletico Roma F.C. On 31 August 2011 he joined Monza.

Representative team
In Although made a few appearances for Sassuolo, he played once for Italy under-21 Serie B representative team in an internal training match.

References

External links
 Profile at Football.it 
 
 

Italian footballers
Serie B players
Serie C players
A.C.N. Siena 1904 players
U.S. Sassuolo Calcio players
U.S. Pergolettese 1932 players
Association football midfielders
Footballers from Naples
1989 births
Living people
A.S.D. Termoli Calcio 1920 players